In opera and musical theatre, a sitzprobe (from the German for seated rehearsal) is a rehearsal where the singers sing with the orchestra, focusing attention on integrating the two groups. It is often the first rehearsal where the orchestra and singers rehearse together. The equivalent Italian term is prova all'italiana.

References
Warrack, John and West, Ewan (1992), The Oxford Dictionary of Opera, 782 pages,

External links
Regent's Park Open Air Theatre sitzprobe - Video footage of a sitzprobe for Regent's Park Open Air Theatre's 2010 production of Stephen Sondheim's musical Into the Woods
& Juliet Musical Sitzprobe - the cast of & Juliet perform with an orchestra for the musical featuring the music of Max Martin

Opera terminology
German words and phrases